Maury Waugh (born c. 1940) is an American football coach.  He is an assistant coach at Trine University in Angola, Indiana, a position he has held since 2010.  Waugh served as the head football coach at the University of Dubuque in Dubuque, Iowa from 1969 to 1974, Simpson College in Indianola, Iowa from 1975 to 1979, and Lake Forest College in Lake Forest, Illinois from  1992 to 1994.

Head coaching record

College football

References

External links
 Trine profile

Year of birth missing (living people)
Living people
Drake Bulldogs football coaches
Dubuque Spartans baseball coaches
Dubuque Spartans football coaches
Dubuque Spartans football players
Lake Forest Foresters football coaches
Northwestern Wildcats football coaches
Saint Francis Cougars football coaches
Simpson Storm football coaches
Toronto Argonauts coaches
Trine Thunder football coaches
Wayne State Warriors football coaches
Western Carolina Catamounts football coaches
High school football coaches in Illinois
High school football coaches in Indiana
People from Aledo, Illinois